The Ballad of Purple St. James is the third studio album of American singer, Yahzarah. The album was released on May 4, 2010, on the recording label +FE Music. This is Yahzarah's first album in seven years.

Recording 
The album was originally titled Introducing Purple St. James with the song "Your Love" as the lead single. In 2010, it was announced by Yahzarah's label that the album was retitled "The Ballad of Purple St. James". The album features production from Yahzarah, Nicolay, and Phonte of the +FE Music. The album features elements of electronic soul and pop influenced mixed with R&B music.

Promotion

Singles 
In 2009, Yahzarah released a buzz single "Your Love". When the album's title changed, another song known as "The Tickler" was given promotion and music video. The song was dubbed as another buzz single. In March 2010, she released the first single "Why Dontcha Call Me No More" which was available as a free download on the Foreign Exchange Music's website. Following the release of the single, a sampler was released as a free download.  On May 19, 2010, the music video for "Why Dontcha Call Me No More" was released. On September 15, 2010, Yahzarah released her second single "Cry Over You" and released the video to YouTube.

In late 2010, Yahzarah began promoting her third single "Starship". In May 2011, Yahzarah confirmed on her Twitter account that a video for her single "Love Come Save the Day" was progress. In September 2011, the music video for "Love Come Save the Day" was released to YouTube.

Tour 
In 2010, Yahzarah began her Love vs Lust tour with The Foreign Exchange to promote the album.

Critical response 

The album received a favorable review from Allmusic.com. gave "The Ballad of Purple St. James" a 4.5 rating out of 5 stars. Andy Kellman of Allmusic.com stated, "YahZarah had worked on and off with the duo for several years, but never in a concentrated burst like this. The album allows the singer and songwriter to flash her vocal and thematic flexibility in ways her previous albums did not." The album charted at #75 on Billboard's Top R&B/Hip-Hop chart. The album also became #2 on Amazon's Top Album Sellers and #1 on Reverbnation's R&B Albums Chart.

Track listing 
 Strike Up the Band
 Why Dontcha Call Me No More
 Cry Over You (featuring Phonte)
 All My Days (featuring Darien Brockington)
 Come Back As A Flower
 Dedicated To You
 The Lie
 Last to Leave
 Have A Heart
 Change Your Mind
 Starship
 Shadow
 Love Come Save The Day
 Fast Lane (2012 re-released edition)

Leftover tracks 
 Yahz 
 The Basement/Purple Intro 
 I'm A Legend 
 Fast Lane 
 I Came I Saw
 Like A Flower
 Hour Glass
 Radio
 The Tickler
 Chocolate Inside 
 Highest High
 Beautiful Place 
 Sacrifice 
 Struggle 
 Your Love

See also 
 Yahzarah discography

References 

2010 albums
Albums produced by Nicolay (musician)
Albums produced by Symbolyc One